Makoce Washte is a 40-acre plot of native prairie owned by The Nature Conservancy about 10 miles west of Sioux Falls, South Dakota. The name means 'Beautiful Earth'.

References

External links
 Makoce Washte page on the Sioux Falls Bird Club website

Protected areas of South Dakota